Nelly Karim (born 18 December 1974) is an Egyptian actress, model, and ballerina.

Life and career 
Nelly is the daughter of a Russian mother and an Egyptian father from Zagazig. Karim said in an interview with the journalist Nishan that her beauty is pharaonic, not Russian, and that she resembles her father. She has one brother who is elder than her, his name is Ashraf who is a doctor and he migrated to United States. She lived with her family in Russia till 16 years old but she spent summer school vacations with her family in Alexandria, Egypt. Then, her family came to Egypt and her father died. Nelly has drawn notice for her 2006 refusal to portray "seductive roles". In 2016, she served as jury member for the Horizons section at the 73rd edition of the Venice Film Festival.

As of 2020, she has appeared in over 30 Egyptian films and TV series.

Personal life 
Nelly married at a young age under the will of her mother. She had two sons and then divorced. She married Hani Abuelnaga in 2004 and they have two daughters. They divorced in 2015.

In August 2021, she married squash player Hisham Mohd Ashour.

Filmography

Film 
(2001) Shabab Ala El Hawa ( Youth on Air )(as Sahar) 
(2002) Horob Momya (Runaway Mummy)  as Dalia)
(2004) Eskendreyya Nyu York (Alexandria... New York )(as Carmen / Rita Haweri)
(2004) Hobbak Nar (Your Love Is Fire) ( as Salma as Juliet)
(2004) Ghabi menno fih (Stupid From Him In Him) ( as Samia)
(2004) Enta Omri ( You're My Life) ( as Shams) 
(2005) Harb Italia (War of Italy) ( as Hana)
(2006) Fattah Enek (Open Your Eyes) ( as Yasmin )
(2006) Hatta Nehayet El Alam (To End Of The World) ( as Salma)
(2007) Ahlam El Fata El Tayesh (Rash Boy Dreams) ( as herself)
(2008) Ehna Et'abelna Abl Kedah? (Have We Met Before?)  ( as Sarah)
(2009) Wahed -Sefr (One-Zero)  as Riham)
(2010)678 ( 678 ) ( as Seba)
(2010) Alzheimer (“Alzheimer's) ( as Mona the nurse)
(2010) El Ragel El Ghamed Be Salamtoh (Mysterious Man By His Wow) (as Lamis)
(2014) El Fil El Azrq (The Blue Elephant)
(2016)Eshtebak( Clash )
(2017) Bashteri Ragel (I Buy A man) ( as Shams)
(2019) El Fil El Azra' 2(The Blue Elephant 2)
(2020) Khat Dam (Blood Line) (as Lamia)
(2021) El Thalathah 12 (Tuesday 12) (as Mariam)
(2021) 30 Youm (30 Days)

Television 
(2000) Weshsh El Amar (Face of the Moon )
(2001) Hadith El Sabah W El Masa  ( Speech Of Morning And Evening)
(2009) Hedu nesbi (Relative Quietness)
(2013) Zat (Zat)(as Zat) 
(2014) Segn El Nesa (Women's Prison) 
(2014)  Saraya Abdin (Abdin Palace)
(2015)  That El Saytarah (Under Control) 
(2016) Soqot Horr  (Free Fall)
(2017)  Le A'la Se'r  (For Highest Price)
(2018)  Ekhtefa  (Disappearance)
(2020)  Be Mit Wesh/Multifaceted (2020)
(2021) Ded El Kasr (Against Breakup)
(2022) El Gisser (The Bridge)
(2022) Faten Amal Harbi (Faten Amal Harbi)

Awards
Best Actress at the Cairo International Film Festival (2004, won for Enta omry, tied with Eszter Bagaméri)
Special Award at the Cairo National Festival for Egyptian Cinema (2010, won for Wahed-Sefr)
Jury Grand Prize at the Asia Pacific Screen Awards (2011, group award with Nahed El Sebaï and Bushra for 678)
Best Actress at the Arab Film Festival (2012, won for 678)

References

External links 

 
 

1974 births
Living people
Egyptian film actresses
Egyptian television actresses
Egyptian female models
Egyptian ballerinas
Egyptian people of Russian descent
People from Alexandria
Actresses from Cairo
Malmö Arab Film Festival winners